Joseph Hueber, (1715 or 1717–1787), was a significant Austrian baroque master builder who studied under Johann Lukas von Hildebrandt.

Buildings & Projects
Among his most notable achievements are the Parish Church of Our Lady on the Weizberg in the Styrian town of Weiz and the Pilgrimage Church of St. Veit in Sankt Veit am Vogau.  His most significant work is the famous library at the Admont Abbey.  He also supervised the construction of a baroque pavilion for the park at Schloss Eggenberg in the Styrian capital of Graz as well as the conversion of the Schloss Eggenberg theater into a baroque palace chapel, Our Lady of the Snows.

References

Literature 
 "Der Barockbaumeister Joseph Hueber". in: Bilder aus Vergangenheit und Gegenwart. Beiträge zur Kultur- und Wirtschaftsgeschichte. (Weiz - Geschichte und Landschaft in Einzeldarstellungen. Hrsg. v. Leopold Farnleitner. 5), Weiz 1958, p.4044.

1787 deaths
1710s births
18th-century Austrian architects
Architecture in Slovenia
Architects from Vienna
Architects from Graz